Lulu's tody-flycatcher (Poecilotriccus luluae), also known as Johnson's tody-flycatcher, is a species of bird in the family Tyrannidae. It was briefly known as Lulu's tody-tyrant, but following the death of Ned K. Johnson, one of the people responsible for the description of this species in 2001, the name was modified to Johnson's tody-tyrant by the SACC. Following the move of this species to the genus Poecilotriccus from Todirostrum, it was recommended modifying the name to tody-flycatcher. It is endemic to humid thickets, usually near bamboo, in the highlands of Amazonas and San Martín in northern Peru. It is threatened by habitat loss and is consequently considered endangered by BirdLife International and IUCN.

References

External links
BirdLife Species Factsheet.

Lulu's tody-flycatcher
Birds of the Peruvian Andes
Endemic birds of Peru
Lulu's tody-flycatcher
Taxonomy articles created by Polbot